This is a list of events that occurred in the year 1280 in Norway.

Incumbents
Monarch: Eric II Magnusson (along with Magnus VI Haakonsson)

Events

Arts and literature

Births

Deaths
Magnus VI of Norway, king (born 1238).

References

Norway